Santa Rosa Esporte Clube, commonly known as Santa Rosa Esporte Clube, is a Brazilian football club based in Icoaraci, a district of Belém, Pará state. They competed in the Série C once.

History
The club was founded on January 6, 1924. They competed in the Série C in 1997, when they were eliminated in the Round of 16.

Stadium
Santa Rosa Esporte Clube play their home games at Estádio Abelardo Conduru. The stadium has a maximum capacity of 3,000 people.

References

Association football clubs established in 1924
Football clubs in Pará
1924 establishments in Brazil